Pamesar (also Romanized as Pāmesār and Pāmsār) is a village in Lulaman Rural District, in the Central District of Fuman County, Gilan Province, Iran. At the 2006 census, its population was 328, in 90 families.

References 

Populated places in Fuman County